Ghourat was a village and now is a locality in the city of Khurai, India.

Etymology
The name 'Ghourat' refers to "Dense region" which signifies the denser region of crops at that particular region.

References

Khurai